Xiaoshangqiao is a place in Henan, China. It is approximately 144 hectares. It was constructed in the late Erligang period and rediscovered in the 1990s.

References

Cities in Henan